Cyprus competed at the 2015 Games of the Small States of Europe, in Reykjavík, Iceland from 1 to 6 June 2015.

Medalists

Athletics
	

Men
Track

Field

Women
Track

Field

Basketball

Golf

Gymnastics

Judo

Shooting

Swimming

Table tennis

Tennis

Volleyball

Nations at the 2015 Games of the Small States of Europe
2015 in Cypriot sport
Cyprus at multi-sport events